Moments Like This may refer to:

 "Moments Like This" (Frank Loesser and Burton Lane song), a 1938 popular song
 "Moments Like This" (Reamonn song)
 Moments Like This (album), an album by Peggy Lee, featuring a cover of the 1938 song

See also
"A Moment Like This", a 2002 song by Kelly Clarkson